Importin-9 is a protein that in humans is encoded by the IPO9 gene.

References

Further reading